The 1960 New Mexico gubernatorial election took place on November 8, 1960, in order to elect the governor of New Mexico. Incumbent Democrat John Burroughs ran for reelection to a second term.

Democratic primary
The Democratic primary was won by incumbent governor John Burroughs.

Results

Republican primary
The Republican primary was won by former governor Edwin L. Mechem.

Results

General election

Results

References

1960
gubernatorial
New Mexico
November 1960 events in the United States